The Chongling River, also known as Jiao River and Lingyuan River, is a right-bank tributary and one of the largest tributaries of the middle Xiang River in Hunan, China. The river rises in the Renxingling Mountains of Lanshan County. Its main stream runs generally south to north through Lansghan, Jiahe, Xintian, Xintian, Leiyang, Changning and Hengnan counties, and it joins the Xiang at Jiaohekou of Hengnan.

References

Rivers of Hunan